Ryan Francis Donnelly has been Chair of Pharmaceutical Technology at Queen's University Belfast since 2013. His research is focused on the design and physicochemical characterisation of advanced polymeric drug delivery systems for transdermal and topical applications.

He graduated with a first-class degree in Pharmacy from Queen's University Belfast in 1999, where he subsequently completed his PhD in Pharmaceutics in 2003.

He has an h-index of 78.

References

Year of birth missing (living people)
Living people
Alumni of Queen's University Belfast
Academics of Queen's University Belfast
Pharmaceutical scientists